Kurt Thulin (born 8 August 1939) is a retired Swedish ice hockey player. Thulin was part of the Djurgården Swedish champions' team of 1959, 1960, 1962, and 1963.

References

Swedish ice hockey players
Djurgårdens IF Hockey players
1939 births
Living people